Edward Houston (born March 29, 1937) is an American sprint canoer from New York City who competed in the late 1950s. He finished 12th in the K-2 10000 m event at the 1956 Summer Olympics in Melbourne.

References
Sports-reference.com profile

External links

1937 births
American male canoeists
Canoeists at the 1956 Summer Olympics
Living people
Olympic canoeists of the United States
Sportspeople from New York City